Scedella formosella is a species of tephritid or fruit flies in the genus Scedella of the family Tephritidae.

Distribution
Japan, Philippines, Malaysia to New Guinea, Solomon Islands, Guam.

References

Tephritinae
Insects described in 1915
Diptera of Asia